Kathlaniidae is a nematode family in the superfamily Cosmoceroidea.

References

External links

Rhabditia
Nematode families